Neobartsia alba, formerly Bartsia alba,  is a species of flowering plants in the family Orobanchaceae. It is endemic to Ecuador.

References

alba
Endemic flora of Ecuador
Vulnerable flora of South America
Taxonomy articles created by Polbot
Plants described in 1990
Taxobox binomials not recognized by IUCN